Agustín Ezequiel Almendra (born 11 February 2000) is an Argentine professional footballer who plays as a midfielder for Boca Juniors.

Honours
Boca Juniors
Primera División: 2017–18, 2019–20
Copa Argentina: 2019–20
Copa de la Liga Profesional: 2020, 2022
Supercopa Argentina: 2018

References

External links

2000 births
Living people
Argentine footballers
Association football midfielders
Boca Juniors footballers
Argentine Primera División players
Sportspeople from Buenos Aires Province
Argentina under-20 international footballers